Byrkjelo is a village in the municipality of Gloppen in Vestland county, Norway. It is located about halfway between the villages of Sandane (in Gloppen) and Skei (in Sunnfjord) along the European route E39 highway.

Byrkjelo is located near the great Jostedalsbreen National Park, the Myklebustbreen glacier, and the lake Breimsvatn.  Byrkjelo Stadium is used for several large athletic competitions each year. One of the largest dairy factories in Western Norway is located in Byrkjelo.  It is operated by Tine.

References

Villages in Vestland
Gloppen